Gavia egeriana is an extinct species of loon from the Miocene epoch, where the holotype was found in Dolnice, Czech Republic dating to the Burdigalian. The holotype consisted of two distal ends of the humeri bones. Other more completed material has been found in the Calvert Formation from the Chesapeake Group in the United States, with possible material from the Pungo River Formation from North Carolina. These material consist of the right coracoid and nearly two-thirds of a right ulna and date to the Langhian. G. egeriana was a very small species of loon and it was the earliest, possibly the ancestral species that gave raise to the other species in the genus.

References

Gaviiformes
Prehistoric birds